The Mazas Prison (French: Prison de Mazas) was a prison in Paris, France.

Designed by architects Émile Gilbert and Jean-François-Joseph Lecointe, it was inaugurated in 1850 and located near the Gare de Lyon, on the Diderot boulevard. The building was destroyed in 1900.

References

External links

 Webpage with information and a picture of the prison (in French)

1850 establishments in France
19th century in Paris
Defunct prisons in Paris
Buildings and structures completed in 1850
Buildings and structures demolished in 1900
1900 disestablishments in France
19th-century architecture in France